Bareh Jula (also Romanized as Bareh Jūlā, Barā Jūlā, and Berah Jūlā) is a village in Boluran Rural District, Darb-e Gonbad District, Kuhdasht County, Lorestan Province, Iran. At the 2006 census, its population was 114, in 21 families.

References 

Yasmin

Towns and villages in Kuhdasht County